The 2017 Asian Canoe Sprint Championships were the 17th Asian Canoe Sprint Championships and took place from October 15–18, 2017 in Shanghai, China.

Medal summary

Men

Women

Medal table

References

Complete Results

External links
Asian Canoe Confedeation

Canoe Sprint Championships
Asian Canoe Sprint Championships
Asian Canoeing Championships
International sports competitions hosted by China